Zum Audio vol. 2 is a compilation album by the label ZUM, released in 1998.

Track listing

External links
 Official album website

1998 compilation albums